Joseph William Kappen (30 October 1941 – 17 June 1990), also known as the Saturday Night Strangler, was a Welsh serial killer who committed the rape and murder of three teenage girls in Llandarcy and Tonmawr, near his home town of Port Talbot, in 1973. Kappen is also suspected of committing a fourth murder in February 1976.

Kappen's confirmed victims were all 16-year-old females whom he lured into his car on Saturday evenings in Briton Ferry and Swansea respectively. All three were driven to rural locations where they were subsequently raped, then killed by strangulation. Kappen was never arrested for his crimes, and died of lung cancer in 1990. 

Kappen is notable for being the first person ever to be posthumously identified as a serial killer via familial DNA profiling. He was also the first documented serial killer in Welsh history.

Background
Joseph Kappen was born on Thursday, 30 October 1941 and raised in Port Talbot, a heavily industrial town in Wales dominated by its large steelworks. His parents' marriage broke up when he was young and he was raised by his stepfather. He was one of seven siblings.

Kappen began eliciting police attention for petty offences at age 12. He went on to accumulate over thirty convictions for car theft, petrol theft, burglary and assault, and spent years in and out of prison. Kappen alternately worked as a lorry or bus driver, and then as a bouncer. He was known to never stay employed for long and was described as a loner. 

In 1962 Kappen met his first wife, 17-year-old Christine Powell, and they married in February 1964. Ten days after their nuptials, Kappen was sent to prison for burglary. Christine then gave birth to a daughter and then to a son, Paul, after she was raped by Kappen after his release from prison. Christine later testified that Kappen was physically abusive towards her and would rape her every two weeks. At one point he fatally strangled the family dog in front of his son while walking it on a nearby beach because it was "too old".

Kappen was known to regularly pursue local teenage girls during the marriage, with his job as a bouncer giving him an opportunity to interact with them. When working as a bus driver he was known to use his rest breaks to approach teenage girls on the village green at Llandarcy. In 1964 Kappen attempted to force himself on a 15-year-old schoolgirl in his Sandfields housing estate, but she escaped. In February 1973 a man resembling Kappen picked up two female hitchhikers and drove them to a nearby isolated road before attempting to rape both of them, but they also managed to escape; the victims did not report the incident as one thought she would get into trouble with her father.

1973 murders
On Saturday 14 July 1973 Sandra Newton, aged 16, went missing after a night out in Briton Ferry. Three days later her body was found raped and strangled in a rural location some miles away. Newton had been abducted after trying to hitchhike home after visiting a nightclub that night. She was strangled with her own skirt and dumped in a ditch near a coal mine in Tonmawr. Little attempt had been made to hide the body, with it being left at the entrance of a culvert. Police suspected a local man was responsible due to the detailed knowledge of the area the killer would appear to have needed to be aware of the remote dump site.

Two months later in the early hours of Sunday 16 September 1973 Geraldine Hughes and Pauline Floyd, both aged 16, hitched a lift home after a Saturday night out at a nightclub in Swansea. The next morning they were found dead, their bodies being found raped and strangled in Llandarcy woodland five miles away. It appeared that one girl had attempted to escape from her attacker and had made it yards from the road near to where her father had worked, but had been caught by her attacker and killed. The murders created a sense of fear in the community over whether the attacker would strike again. Although they occurred nearby, at the time the murders of Hughes and Floyd were not linked to the similar murder of Newton.

Initial investigation
Police soon established that Hughes and Floyd had been seen getting a lift home in a white Austin 1100 on the night of their disappearance. Police followed up numerous lines of enquiry but, as was the case in police investigations at the time, all intelligence and information was collected on large amounts of paperwork, which complicated the inquiry. The Port Talbot steelworks employed 13,000 men, all of whom had to be considered as potential suspects. Both the construction of the nearby M4 motorway and the ongoing Neath fair meant hundreds of itinerant workers had to be considered, as well as the countless strangers these events brought into the area. Detectives attempted to trace men who owned an Austin 1100 in the area, but it meant that more than 10,000 drivers had to be visited and questioned. A miners' strike forced the British government to implement a three-day working week for everyone across the country, which further reduced the resources of the enquiry and hampered the investigation.

However, one of the men who was investigated as part of enquiries concerning the Austin 1100 was Kappen, who owned that model of vehicle. When police turned up at his home to speak to him, they found his Austin was on blocks with its wheels removed, with Kappen claiming that he could not have committed the murders as his car was not roadworthy. However, in the days after the killings, Kappen's car was logged as being on the road by police carrying out stop and check operations. This would have disproved this claim, but without a computerised system for cross-referencing, this fact was not noticed by detectives at the time. Kappen also claimed to have been at Neath fair on the night of the murders and his wife gave him a false alibi, which she later said was common for her to do when police investigated her husband. Ultimately, therefore, Kappen was not pursued further as a suspect at the time. In mid-1974 the investigation was scaled down.

Re-opening of investigations
Police hoped that advancements in DNA testing would help solve the murders, and in 1998 there was a significant development when a profile of the killer's DNA was isolated via testing on the clothing of Hughes and Floyd. In 2000 the profile was uploaded to the DNA database to see if it matched any person arrested or charged since 1995 (the year in which DNA started to be taken from people arrested of crimes), although no match was made. However, the developments in DNA led to a full reinvestigation of the murders, titled Operation Magnum. In January 2001 the Llandarcy murders were reconstructed on BBC One's Crimewatch. 

Around this time there was media speculation linking serial killer Fred West to the murders as he once worked in Llandarcy, but this was swiftly ruled out by police after the DNA was checked. 35,000 persons of interest were initially identified for DNA testing, but a psychological profiler was employed to reduce the number to a priority list of 500. Fifty of these were witnesses, relatives of the victims, stepfathers, boyfriends and anyone who had featured prominently in the initial investigation, and the others were known criminal suspects. Kappen was listed as suspect number 200, and detectives visited what they believed to be his address in Port Talbot in August 2001 but they discovered that he had died of lung cancer in June 1990, although his former wife still lived there.

Two months later, testing on the clothes of Sandra Newton revealed that she had been a victim of the same killer as Hughes and Floyd, meaning that the three murders were officially linked for the first time and revealing that all three had been murdered by the same unidentified individual.

Familial DNA enquiries
Due to the period of time that had elapsed since the murders, South Wales Police decided to employ a previously unknown tactic of searching for the DNA of possible living descendants of the murderer as their genetic profiles would be similar to the killer's.Fifty percent of an individuals' DNA is inherited from each parent, so investigators believed that they could discover who the killer was by making a partial match between the killer's profile and that of any children they may have had. Investigators therefore examined local individuals' profiles that matched part of the killer's profile and created a list of 100 potential suspects. One of these was local car thief Paul Kappen, whose DNA was already on police files but who was only seven years old at the time of the murders. Paul's profile showed a distinctive similarity to that of the killer's, prompting police to make his deceased father Joseph, known to have been investigated in the original enquiry, the prime suspect.

Exhumation of body and positive DNA match
The findings of the DNA testing led detectives to apply to Home Secretary David Blunkett to exhume Kappen's body in order to confirm through DNA that he was the murderer, which was granted. In 2002 the body was exhumed from Goytre Cemetery on the outskirts of Port Talbot, with it being said by witnesses that a thunderstorm suddenly passed over as the exhumation began and that a large thunderclap was heard when the ground was first dug up, suggesting to them that they had "unearthed evil". 
Kappen's family consistently denied that he could have been responsible for the murders and claimed he was innocent despite the evidence.

Forensic testing on Kappen's remains subsequently established a perfect match to the murderer's sample, finally proving beyond doubt that Kappen was responsible for the murders. South Wales Police declared the case closed. The now-elderly surviving parents of the victims expressed relief that they had finally received a form of closure, with the mother of Hughes stating, "Now we can close the book on that hell forever."

After the findings, Kappen's former wife Christine Powell, who had previously insisted that Kappen was innocent, stated that "our first thoughts are with the families of the victims. Our concerns are protection from hurt for our children. We are all deeply shocked by the revelations."

Historical significance of the case
The Kappen investigation was the first in the world to utilise familial DNA tracing in order to posthumously identify a serial killer, and to solve a previously unsolved murder with familial DNA. It was also reported that the exhumation of Kappen's body made history as the first time a serial killer was exhumed to ascertain his guilt. In 1996 a deceased suspect had been exhumed in the Bible John case for DNA testing, but he was subsequently found to not have been the perpetrator. Kappen is also considered the first documented serial killer in Welsh history.

The outcome of the case created hopes of solving other unsolved historical murders through DNA testing, and South Wales Police subsequently embarked on DNA screening in order to solve the murder of Lynette White, which was subsequently solved in 2003 when Jeffrey Gafoor was convicted in the killing. In 2004, another similar attempt to identify a serial killer through familial DNA was made by Strathclyde Police in the Bible John case when they announced their intention to test a number of men after the discovery of a DNA sample at a minor crime scene in 2002. This sample showed an 80% match to the profile they had from the killer, which implied that the offender was a relative of Bible John.

Other suspected crimes
It is not known if Kappen ever killed again after September 1973, but he remains a suspect in the unsolved murder of Maureen Mulcahy, aged 23, in February 1976. Mulcahy was similarly strangled after a Saturday night out, being found dead the following morning in wasteland very close to the Sandfields estate, where Kappen was living at the time. Witness testimony points to Kappen having abducted her in a manner similar to the 1973 murders. As soon as Kappen had been identified in the 1973 cases, detectives announced their intention to speak to Mulcahy's family. However, there was no available DNA evidence to examine or potentially link to Kappen and thus Police were unable to prove or disprove his involvement.

Police also reexamined the 1973 disappearance of nine-year-old Christine Markham from Scunthorpe, after learning that Kappen had worked as a lorry driver in Scunthorpe and had lived in lodgings in the Humberside area soon after the girl vanished. However, serial child abductor and killer Robert Black remains the prime suspect in the Markham case. After he was finally imprisoned in 1994, police announced their suspicions that Black committed a number of other murders and their intention to investigate him for murders including Markham's.

Kappen has also been suspected of having committed numerous other unsolved rapes.

In popular culture
The Kappen case has featured in a number of documentaries:
 In 2002, a two-part documentary titled "Digging for the Truth - The Full Story of the Llandarcy Murders" was shown on ITV Wales.
 In 2016 another documentary on the case was released on ITV Wales as part of the Crimes Files series.
 In 2018 a series 2 episode of Sky UK's Robbie Coltrane's Critical Evidence featured the case. The episode was titled "The Saturday Night Strangler: Joe Kappen".
 Also in 2018 a series 1 episode of Evidence of Evil was released that focused on the case titled "The Saturday Night Strangler".
 In 2019 a series 1 episode of Jackie Malton's documentary series The Real Prime Suspect was released on CBS Reality which covered the case, titled "The Saturday Night Strangler".
 In 2020 BBC One Wales released its documentary on the unsolved murder of Maureen Mulcahy in Port Talbot in 1976 and the suspected links between the case and Kappen. The documentary was part of the Dark Land: Hunting the Killers series.
 In 2022 the case was featured on Sky UK's series Forensics: Catching the Killer.

See also

 Joseph James DeAngelo, an American serial killer who was captured through familial DNA profiling
 Bible John, an unidentified 1960s Scottish serial killer who has also been the subject of identification attempts through familial DNA profiling
 Murders of Harry and Megan Tooze, some of Wales' most notorious unsolved murders
 Cold case
 Familial DNA profiling
 List of murderers by number of victims
 List of serial killers in the United Kingdom
 List of serial killers by number of victims
 Unsolved murders in the United Kingdom

Notes

References

Cited works and further reading

External links
 Murders Suspect in UK Crime Probe: A 2002 BBC News article focusing upon the murders committed by Joseph Kappen
 2003 Guardian news article pertaining to Kappen

1941 births
1973 murders in the United Kingdom
1990 deaths
20th-century Welsh criminals
British male criminals
British people convicted of burglary
British people convicted of robbery
British people convicted of sexual assault
British people convicted of theft
Fugitives
Fugitives wanted by the United Kingdom
Fugitives wanted on murder charges
Male serial killers
Murder in Wales
People from Port Talbot
Unsolved murders in Wales
Violence against women in the United Kingdom
Welsh rapists
Welsh murderers of children
Welsh serial killers